Banbury is a historic market town on the River Cherwell in Oxfordshire, South East England. It had a population of 54,335 at the 2021 Census.

Banbury is a significant commercial and retail centre for the surrounding area of north Oxfordshire and southern parts of Warwickshire and Northamptonshire which are predominantly rural. Banbury's main industries are motorsport, car components, electrical goods, plastics, food processing and printing. Banbury is home to the world's largest coffee-processing facility (Jacobs Douwe Egberts), built in 1964. The town is famed for Banbury cakes, a spiced sweet pastry dish.

History

Toponymy
The name Banbury may derive from "Banna", a Saxon chieftain said to have built a stockade there in the 6th century (or possibly a byname from  meaning felon, murderer), and  /  meaning settlement. In Anglo Saxon it was called  (dative ). The name appears as Banesberie in the Domesday Book. Another known spelling was Banesebury in Medieval times.

General history

During excavations for the construction of an office building in Hennef Way in 2002, the remains of a British Iron Age settlement with circular buildings dating back to 200 BC were found. The site contained around 150 pieces of pottery and stone. Later there was a Roman villa at nearby Wykham Park.

The area was settled by the Saxons around the late 5th century. In about 556 Banbury was the scene of a battle between the local Anglo-Saxons of Cynric and Ceawlin, and the local Romano-British. It was a local centre for Anglo-Saxon settlement by the mid-6th century. Banbury developed in the Anglo-Saxon period under Danish influence, starting in the late 6th century. It was assessed at 50 hides in the Domesday survey and was then held by the Bishop of Lincoln.

The Saxons built Banbury on the west bank of the River Cherwell. On the opposite bank they built Grimsbury, which was formerly part of Northamptonshire. Another district, Neithrop, is one of the oldest areas in Banbury, having first been recorded as a hamlet in the 13th century. Both Grimsbury and Neithrop were formally incorporated into the borough of Banbury in 1889.

Banbury stands at the junction of two ancient roads: Salt Way (used as a bridle path to the west and south of the town), its primary use being transport of salt; and Banbury Lane, which began near Northampton and is closely followed by the modern  road. It continued through what is now Banbury's High Street and towards the Fosse Way at Stow-on-the-Wold. Banbury's medieval prosperity was based on wool.

Banbury Castle was built from 1135 by Alexander, Bishop of Lincoln, and survived into the Civil War, when it was besieged. Due to its proximity to Oxford, the King's capital, Banbury was at one stage a Royalist town, but the inhabitants were known to be strongly Puritan. The castle was demolished after the war.

Banbury played an important part in the English Civil War as a base of operations for Oliver Cromwell, who is reputed to have planned the Battle of Edge Hill in the back room (which can still be visited) of a local inn, the Reindeer Inn as it was then known (today's Ye Olde Reine Deer Inn). The town was pro-Parliamentarian, but the castle was manned by a Royalist garrison who supported King Charles I. In 1645 during the Civil War, Parliamentary troops were billeted in nearby Hanwell for nine weeks and villagers petitioned the Warwickshire Committee of Accounts to pay for feeding them.

The opening of the Oxford Canal from Hawkesbury Junction to Banbury on 30 March 1778 gave the town a cheap and reliable supply of Warwickshire coal. In 1787 the Oxford Canal was extended southwards, finally opening to Oxford on 1 January 1790. The canal's main boat yard was the original outlay of today's Tooley's Boatyard.

People's Park was set up as a private park in 1890 and opened in 1910, along with the adjacent bowling green.

The land south of the Foscote Private Hospital in Calthorpe and Easington Farm were mostly open farmland until the early 1960s as shown by the Ordnance Survey maps of 1964, 1955 and 1947. It had only a few farmsteads, the odd house, an allotment field (now under the Sainsbury's store), the Municipal Borough of Banbury council's small reservoir just south of Easington Farm and a water spring lay to the south of it. The Ruscote estate, which now has a notable South Asian community, was expanded in the 1950s because of the growth of the town due to the London overspill and further grew in the mid-1960s.

British Railways closed Merton Street railway station and the Buckingham to Banbury line to passenger traffic at the end of 1960. Merton Street goods depot continued to handle livestock traffic for Banbury's cattle market until 1966, when this too was discontinued and the railway dismantled. In March 1962 Sir John Betjeman celebrated the line from Culworth Junction in his poem Great Central Railway, Sheffield Victoria to Banbury. British Railways closed this line too in 1966.

The main railway station, previously called Banbury General but now called simply Banbury, is now served by trains running from London Paddington via Reading and Oxford, from London Marylebone via High Wycombe and Bicester onwards to Birmingham and Kidderminster and by Cross Country Trains from Bournemouth to Birmingham and Manchester.

Banbury used to have a cattle market. Situated on Merton Street in Grimsbury, for many decades, cattle and other farm animals were driven there on the hoof from as far as Scotland to be sold to feed the growing population of London and other towns. Since its closure in June 1998, a new housing development has been built on its site which includes Dashwood Primary School. The estate, which lies between Banbury and Hanwell, was built on the grounds of Hanwell Farm during 2005 and 2006.

Banburyshire

Banburyshire is an informal area centred on Banbury, claimed to include parts of Northamptonshire and Warwickshire as well as north Oxfordshire. Use of the term dates from the early to mid 19th century. It was common in the 19th century for market towns in England to describe their hinterland by tacking "shire" onto the town's name. "Stones Map of Banburyshire" held by the Centre of Banbury Studies was published in the 1870s or 1880s and it asserted that the term originated in the 1830s but no source is given for that assertion. In the 1850s magazine articles used "Banburyshire" or the hyphenated term "Banbury-shire". The Banburyshire Natural History Society was formed in 1881.
In the 20th century a number of books used the term "Banburyshire" in their titles, dating from the early 1960s.
The county of Oxfordshire has two main commercial centres, the city of Oxford itself that serves most of the south of the county, and Banbury that serves the north (such as Adderbury, Deddington, Wroxton, Great Bourton and Bloxham) plus parts of the neighbouring counties of Northamptonshire and Warwickshire.

The villages of King's Sutton and Middleton Cheney, and possibly also Aynho, Fenny Compton, Charlton and Croughton could be considered part of Banburyshire, as well as Upper and Lower Brailes. The settlements of Bicester, Hinton-in-the-Hedges, Chipping Norton and Hook Norton are on the border of Banburyshire's area.

Local development plans

There was a plan in the late 2000s to expand the Bretch Hill estate westwards into local farmland, but this has now been suspended due to the credit crunch and local hostility to the plan, including the southern expansion towards Bodicote.

The Hanwell Fields Estate was built in the north between 2001 and 2009. It was intended to provide affordable social housing to the west and north of Banbury, and more upmarket housing in the Hanwell fields area.

Local government

In January 1554 Banbury was granted a royal charter that established the town as a borough to be governed by the aldermen of the town. The same charter created the position of High Steward of Banbury.  Banbury was one of the boroughs reformed by the Municipal Reform Act 1835. It retained a borough council until 1974, when under the Local Government Act 1972 it became part of the traditionally Conservative-ruled Cherwell District Council, an unparished area with Charter Trustees. A civil parish with a town council was set up in 2000.

Mayor of Banbury
The post of the mayor of Banbury was created in 1607. The first mayor was Thomas Webb.  A number of roads are named after former mayors of the town, including Mascord Road, Mold Crescent and Fairfax Close. Another former mayor, Angela Billingham, went into national politics.

Geography

Banbury is in the Cherwell Valley with many hills in and around the town. Apart from the town centre, much of Banbury is on a slope and each entry into the town is downhill. Estates such as Bretch Hill and Hardwick are built on top of a hill and much of the town can be seen from both. Other notable hills include the suburban, Crouch Hill and the more central Pinn Hill, and Strawberry Hill on the outskirts of Easington. Mine Hill and Rye Hill lie, along with many others, to the northeast, southeast and west of Banbury.

Banbury is located at the bank of the River Cherwell which sweeps through the town, going just east of the town centre with Grimsbury being the only estate east of the river. As such it has close cultural links with neighbouring Midlands towns such as Stratford-Upon-Avon, Leamington Spa, and Warwick.

In 1998 and 2007, Banbury was subject to heavy flooding due to its location by the River Cherwell. Heavy clay and Ironstone deposits surround Banbury.

Industry and commerce

The Domesday Book in 1086 listed three mills, with a total fiscal value of 45 shillings, on the Bishop of Lincoln's demesne lands, and a fourth which was leased to Robert son of Waukelin by the Bishop. Among Banbury's four Medieval mills was probably a forerunner of Banbury Mill, first referred to by this name in 1695. In the year 1279, Laurence of Hardwick was also paying 3 marks (equivalent to 40 shillings) in annual rent to the Bishop for a mill in the then Hardwick hamlet. The forerunners of Butchers Row were probably long standing butchers' stalls which were known to be in situ by 1438.

The Northern Aluminium Co. Ltd. or Alcan Industries Ltd. pig and rolled aluminium factory was opened in 1931 on land acquired in 1929 on the east of the Southam road, in the then hamlet of Hardwick. The various Alcan facilities on the 53-acre site closed between 2006 and 2007. The factory was demolished between 2008 and 2009. The laboratory was also closed in 2004 and is now used as offices for numerous companies. Another major employer is Jacobs Douwe Egberts, which produces instant coffee. The facility moved to Banbury from Birmingham in 1965.

In the central area were built many large shops, a bus station, and a large car park north of Castle Street. In 1969 proposals for the redevelopment of the central area were in hand, leading to the creation of the Castle shopping centre in 1977 (the centre was later combined into the Castle Quay centre). The 1977 plans to build a multi-storey car park on what is now the open air car park behind Matalan and Poundland were scrapped in 1978 and another one was built to the rear of the Castle Shopping Centre in 1978.

The former Hunt Edmunds brewery premises became Crest Hotels headquarters, but closed in the late 1970s and was abandoned in the late 1980s, while the Crown Hotel and the Foremost Tyres/Excel Exhausts shops found new owners after they closed in 1976 due to falling sales. Hella Manufacturing, a vehicle Electronics firm, closed its factory on the Southam Road in the mid-2000s. The ironmonger, Hoods, opened in the mid-1960s and closed in 2007, with the shop becoming part of the then enlarged Marks and Spencer.

Motorsport
Owing to the surrounding area's notable links with world motorsport, the town is home to many well known organisations within the industry. Prodrive, one of the world's largest motorsport and automotive technology specialists, is based in the town as are a host of race teams involved in competition across many different disciplines and countries.

Within Formula One, two teams have had their base of operations in Banbury. The Simtek team which competed in the 1994 and 1995 F1 World Championships was based on the Wildmere Industrial Estate. The Marussia F1 team had its manufacturing and production facility sited on Thorpe Way Industrial Estate using the building formerly owned by Ascari Cars, a luxury sports car manufacturer. Both Simtek and Marussia F1 had been brought to Banbury by Nick Wirth who owned the Simtek team and was the former Technical Director at Marussia. After Marussia F1 went into administration in 2014, their base was purchased by the United States-based Haas F1 Team to service their cars during the European races.

Until 2017, when the team went into administration and subsequently folded, Manor Racing (the successor to Marussia) was based in the town.

Arden Motorsport, a British multi-formula motorsports team (founded by Red Bull Racing boss Christian Horner), is also based in the town.

Employment
Banbury has one of the UK's lowest unemployment rates, as of April 2016 it stood at 0.7%. Once Poland joined the European Union in 2004, a number of Banbury-based employment agencies began advertising for staff in major Polish newspapers. In 2006 one estimate placed between 5,000 and 6,000 Poles in the town.  With the influx of the largely Roman Catholic Poles, one local church was offering a Mass said partially in Polish and specialist Polish food shops had opened.

Companies and charities

Jacobs Douwe Egberts, in the Ruscote ward of Banbury, is a large food and coffee producing factory. 
It was built in 1964 and has gone through a number of ownership changes since.  It is still sometimes known by its previous names of Bird's, Kraft and General Foods or GF.
 Westminster Group
 Norbar
 Arrival
 Waste & Resources Action Programme
 Dogs for Good
 Warburtons

Cattle market
Banbury was once home to Western Europe's largest cattle market, on Merton Street in Grimsbury. The market was a key feature of Victorian life in the town and county. It was formally closed in June 1998, after being abandoned several years earlier and was replaced with a new housing development and Dashwood Primary School.

Transport

Railway

Services to other parts of the country are provided by CrossCountry south to Reading, Southampton and Basingstoke; northbound trains travel to Manchester Piccadilly and Newcastle.

Canal
The Oxford Canal is a popular place for pleasure trips and tourism. The canal's main boatyard is now the listed site Tooley's Boatyard.

Buses and coaches

Banbury has Stagecoach in Oxfordshire bus services both within the town and linking it with Brackley, Chipping Norton, Oxford and places further afield including Daventry, Leamington Spa and Stratford-upon-Avon.

National Express coaches serve Banbury with regular services to and from major UK towns and cities.  Hennef Way (A422) was upgraded to a dual carriageway, easing traffic on the heavily congested road and providing north Banbury and the town centre with higher-capacity links to the M40 motorway.

Media
The Banbury Guardian is published weekly on Thursdays by Johnston Press, is priced for sale and is a tabloid.  The Banbury Cake was formerly a free newspaper - its print edition ceased publication in 2017 and subsequently its website also closed.

For regional TV news, Banbury is served by BBC South Today and ITV Meridian News, although some parts of the town are better served by BBC Midlands Today and ITV News Central.

The Banbury Music Radio was a local Internet radio station.

Places of interest

Banbury Cross

At one time Banbury had many crosses (the High Cross, the Bread Cross and the White Cross), but these were destroyed by Puritans in 1600. Banbury remained without a cross for more than 250 years until the current Banbury Cross was erected in 1859 at the centre of the town to commemorate the marriage of Victoria, Princess Royal (eldest child of Queen Victoria) to Prince Frederick of Prussia. The current Banbury Cross is a stone, spire-shaped monument decorated in Gothic form. Towns with crosses in England before the reformation were places of Christian pilgrimage.

The English nursery rhyme "Ride a cock horse to Banbury Cross", in its several forms, may refer to one of the crosses destroyed by Puritans in 1600. In April 2005, Princess Anne unveiled a large bronze statue depicting the Fine Lady upon a White Horse of the nursery rhyme. It stands on the corner of West Bar and South Bar, just yards from the present Banbury Cross.

Banbury Museum

Banbury has a museum in the town centre near Spiceball Park, replacing the old museum near Banbury Cross. It is accessible over a bridge from the Castle Quay Shopping Centre or via Spiceball Park Road. Admission to the museum is free. The town's tourist information centre is located in the museum entrance in the Castle Quay Shopping Centre.

Tooley's Boatyard
Tooley's Boatyard was built in 1790 and is a historic site with a 200-year-old blacksmiths' shop.

Spiceball Centre and Park

Spiceball Park is the largest park in Banbury. It is east of the Oxford Canal, mainly west of the River Cherwell, north of Castle Quay and south of Hennef Way. It includes three large fields, a children's play area and a skateboard park. Across the road from the main park there is the sports centre, which includes a swimming pool, courts, café and gym facilities.  The sports centre began to be re-developed in late 2009, for a new centre and café, which was completed by mid 2010.

Other recreational areas and parks
Neithrop is home to the People's Park which opened in 1910, and has a bird house, tennis courts, a large field and a children's play area. The park is often used in the summer to hold small festivals. The park is also one of the town's biggest in terms of the area covered and one of the few major ones not to be built on a steep hill. Easington Recreation Ground is another principal park and recreational area.

Notable place names

Since 1999 bridge 164 on the Oxford Canal in Banbury has borne Tom Rolt's name in commemoration of his book Narrow Boat (as does the Tom Rolt Centre at the Ellesmere Port section of the National Waterways Museum). A blue plaque commemorating Rolt was unveiled at Tooley's Boatyard, Banbury on 7 August 2010 as part of the centenary celebrations of his birth.
Concorde Avenue was named in a 1995 street naming contest in honour of the 50 years' peace (1945–1995) in Europe since the Second World War.
Claypits Close was built in about 2007 and named after the old clay pit on which it was built. There were many small, Victorian clay pits and kilns in the south west of Banbury, but they had closed by the 1920s.
Gillett Road was named after either Joseph Ashby Gillett, who ran Banbury's branch of 18th century Britain's New Bank, or his descendant Sarah Beatrice Gillett, who was mayor in 1926.

Education
One of the campuses of Activate Learning, Banbury and Bicester College, as well as one of the international campuses of Fairleigh Dickinson University at Wroxton Abbey are situated in Banbury. The town also has four secondary schools – North Oxfordshire Academy, Wykham Park Academy, Space Studio Banbury and Blessed George Napier Roman Catholic School – and a number of primary schools. Independent schools in Banbury include Tudor Hall and Al-Madina School.

Religion

In 1377 a pardon was given to a Welshman, who was wanted for killing another Welshman, after the accused person had taken sanctuary in St Mary's parish church.  The Neithrop district of Banbury was the scene of rioting in 1589 after Neithrop's maypole was destroyed by Puritans.

Reverend William Whateley (1583–1639), whose father was several times bailiff or mayor of Banbury, was a notable Banbury vicar, who was instituted in 1610 but had already been a 'lecturer' there for some years. In 1626 Whateley refused communion to his own brother, who had been presented for religious incompetence. A report by the church wardens in 1619 said he was a well liked and tolerant priest.  The Quaker meeting house by the town centre lane called 'The Leys' was built between 1748 and 1750. In 1838, the Catholic St John the Evangelist Church was built, parts of it were designed by Augustus Pugin and it is a Grade II listed building.

Demographics
At the 2021 census there were 54,335 residents in Banbury, up from 46,853, in the 2011 census, and 41,801 in the 2001 census.

In terms of ethnicity in 2021:

84.3% of Banbury residents were White 
8.8% were Asian 
2.3% were Black 
3.1% were Mixed. 
1.2% were from another ethnic group.

In terms of religion, 50.6% of Banbury residents identified as Christian, 40.0% said they had no religion, 6.9% were Muslim, 0.7% were Hindu, 0.6% were Sikh, 0.6% were Buddhists, and 0.6% were from another religion.

Sport
Banbury has several sporting clubs, most notably Banbury United football club. There are also rugby, canoeing, golf, running, triathlon and cricket clubs. These clubs represent a variety of age groups, and play at varying levels, from amateur to national.  Banbury United F.C. was first formed as Spencer Villa in 1931 and their home matches played at Middleton Road. At this time it was essentially a works club. In 1934, they changed their name to Banbury Spencer and moved to the Spencer Stadium.

Banbury and District Golf Club (now defunct) was founded in 1904. The club disappeared in the mid-1920s. The racing was independent (not affiliated to the sports governing body the National Greyhound Racing Club) known as a flapping track, which was the nickname given to independent tracks. The racing lasted until the latter part of 1954.

American Haas F1 Team European forward base of operation is located in Banbury after the collapse of Marussia F1. Manor Racing formerly based in Banbury until the team went into administration in 2016. A number of other motor racing teams have been based in and around Banbury, including Prodrive, Simtek and Virgin Racing.

Twinning
Banbury is twinned with:
 Ermont in France, since 1982.
 Hennef in Germany, since 1981.

Twinning in Banbury began on 26 October 1978, at a public meeting held at the Post-Graduate Education Centre, and called on the initiative of the late Councillor Ron Smith, the then Town Mayor of Banbury. Initial visits between Banbury and Ermont in 1979, and for a long time after there was a period of informal relationship before a formal agreement was signed in 1982. Contact was first made with Hennef about a possible agreement in October 1980 and within a year the formal agreement was signed.  As a consequence of this, two roads in Banbury (Hennef Way and Ermont Way) have been named after the two towns. Likewise a former Railway station square in Hennef has been named Banburyplatz.

Notable people

 Alfie Barbeary, rugby union player for Wasps. 
John Brooke-Little was a former officer of arms who lived in Banbury at the end of his life.
 Novelist Anthony Burgess taught at Banbury Grammar School (now Wykham Park Academy) for several years during the 1950s.
 Television presenter John Craven lives in the Banbury area and has often presented BBC Countryfile stories and features from around the area.
 Thomas Franklin, grandfather of Benjamin Franklin, is buried in Banbury. According to Benjamin's autobiography, his grandfather was born in 1598 and he visited Banbury to see his gravestone in 1758.
 Benjamin Geen was born in Banbury and employed as a staff nurse at the Horton General Hospital. During December 2003 and January 2004, Geen poisoned 17 patients for the thrill of trying to resuscitate them. He was found guilty of two murders and 15 charges of grievous bodily harm in April 2006.
 Gary Glitter, born in Banbury as Paul Francis Gadd; glam rock singer and convicted child sex offender.
 Larry Grayson, comedian and television presenter, was born in Banbury, but grew up in Nuneaton.
 Thomas Butler Gunn was a Banbury born illustrator, writer and war correspondent.
 Richie Hawtin, electronic musician and DJ, was born in Banbury.
 Alan Hodgkin, British physiologist and biophysicist and Nobel Prize in Physiology or Medicine winner, was born in Banbury
 Television hypnotist and hypnotherapist Chris Hughes was born in Banbury, but grew up in Ardley.
 Actress Jo Joyner grew up in Bloxham and studied at the Warriner School. She is best known as Tanya Branning in EastEnders.
 William Knollys, 1st Earl of Banbury, Lord High Admiral and First Lord of the Admiralty of England 1646–1660.
 Former Prime Minister Lord North was MP for Banbury.
 Javad Nurbakhsh, former Master of the Ni'matullāhī Sufi order, lived, died and was buried near Banbury.
 Tim Plester, actor, playwright and film maker, was born and grew up in Banbury
 Chef and Hell's Kitchen star Gordon Ramsay moved to Banbury at the age of 16.
 Rodney Gould is a British former Grand Prix motorcycle road racer and UK short circuit specialist, who was born in Banbury. He was the 250cc world champion in 1970.

Arms

See also
 Banbury cheese – a former cheese produced in Banbury that was once one of the town's most prestigious exports, its production went into decline by the 18th century, and it was eventually forgotten. 
Banbury Lido
Banbury Rural District
National Filling Factory, Banbury
Crouch Hill, Banbury

References

Further reading

External links

 Banbury town council
 

 
Market towns in Oxfordshire
Civil parishes in Oxfordshire
Market crosses in England